Tretyakovsky Proyezd or Tretyakov Drive is a short street with boutiques and shops with many luxury goods located in Kitai-gorod in Moscow and known as one of the most expensive shopping areas in the world.

The mediaeval-looking archway onto Theatre Drive was designed by architect Alexander Kaminsky (1829–1897) in 1871. The project was financed by Kaminsky's brother-in-law, Pavel Mikhailovich Tretyakov, who was also the founder of the Tretyakov Gallery. 

The Tretyakovs' frustration over a blockage on Nikolskaya Street is said to have inspired them to buy the land and revive a Middle Ages thoroughfare from Nikolskaya to the Theatre Drive, across the former Kitai-gorod wall.

Shops and showrooms
Bentley
Ferrari
 Maserati
Tom Ford
Ermenegildo Zegna
Bvlgari
Ralph Lauren
Chopard
Armani
Prada
Gucci
Dolce and Gabbana
Baccarat
Pirogi na Nikolskoi (Café)
Roberto Cavalli
Yves Saint Laurent
Tretyakov Lounge (Restaurant)
Brioni
Graff
Tiffany and Co
Tod's
Tretyakov Spa by Anne Semonin

See also
 List of upscale shopping districts
 Luxury good

Jewellery districts
Streets in Moscow
Shopping districts and streets in Russia
Kitay-Gorod